The Chez Paree was a Chicago nightclub known for its glamorous atmosphere, elaborate dance numbers, and top entertainers. It operated from 1932 until 1960 in the Streeterville neighborhood of Chicago at 610 N. Fairbanks Court. The club was the epitome of the golden age of entertainment, and it hosted a wide variety of performers, from singers to comedians to vaudeville acts. A "new" Chez Paree opened briefly in the mid-1960s on 400 N. Wabash Avenue and was seen in the film Mickey One with Warren Beatty.

History
The Chez Paree was initially opened in 1932 by Mike Fritzel and Joe Jacobson. After reported financial problems operating the club, it was sold to a group of partners in 1949; Jack Schatz, Don Jo Medlevine, Al Kaiser (not the MLB player), and Dave Halper.

Chez Paree was housed on the third floor of a loft building designed in 1917 by the architects Marshall and Fox. Marshall and Fox are best known for the Drake Hotel and Blackstone Hotel. During the Chez Paree's early years, the building's second floor featured the School of Design, which was started by László Moholy-Nagy, the former director of the New Bauhaus School in Chicago.

From 1951 until the Venue's closing it was the remote location for WMAQ (AM)s The Jack Eigen Show.

Current use
The address is now home to Chez, a contemporary event space named in homage to the Chez Paree, and the Internet-based apartment listing service Domu.

Notable performers
Artists who performed at Chez Paree included:

Musicians

The Ames Brothers
The Andrews Sisters
Louis Armstrong
Gus Arnheim
Pearl Bailey
Belle Baker
Polly Bergen
Tony Bennett
Ben Bernie
Connee Boswell
Bobby Breen
Teresa Brewer
Carol Bruce
Joyce Bryant
Lou Breese (house band, 1942-46)
Henry Busse
Cab Calloway
Kitty Carlisle
Rosemary Clooney 
Nat King Cole
Dorothy Collins
Xavier Cugat
Vic Damone
Dorothy Dandridge
Billy Daniels
Bobby Darin
Jean Darling
Sammy Davis Jr.
Morton Downey
Billy Eckstine
Duke Ellington
Dale Evans
Frances Faye
Benny Fields and Blossom Seeley
Gracie Fields
Ella Fitzgerald 
Connie Francis
Jane Froman
Judy Garland
Eydie Gormé
Dolores Gray
Mitzi Green
Joel Grey
Connie Haines
Phil Harris
Woody Herman
Al Hibbler
Hildegarde
Billie Holiday
Libby Holman
Lena Horne
Betty Hutton
Ina Ray Hutton
Mahalia Jackson
Allan Jones
Kitty Kallen
Eartha Kitt
Frankie Laine
Abbe Lane
Frances Langford
Steve Lawrence
Peggy Lee
Liberace
George Liberace
Abbey Lincoln
Jerry Lee Lewis
Ted Lewis
Ella Logan
Julie London
Abe Lyman
Vincent Lopez
Abe Lyman
June MacCloy
Gordon MacRae
Rose Marie
Peter Marshall
Dean Martin
Tony Martin
Johnny Mathis
The McGuire Sisters
Ethel Merman
Borrah Minnevitch
Carmen Miranda
Helen Morgan
Gertrude Niesen
Helen O'Connell
Marguerite Piazza
Jane Powell
Louis Prima
Tito Puente
Johnnie Ray
Della Reese
Phil Regan
Harry Richman
Beverly Roberts
Charles 'Buddy' Rogers
Lillian Roth
Connie Russell
Jean Sablon
Hazel Scott
Wini Shaw
Roberta Sherwood
Nina Simone 
Frank Sinatra
Keely Smith
Ann Sothern
Billy Strayhorn
Yma Sumac 
Jack Teagarden
Charlie LaVere
Kay Thompson and The Williams Brothers
Mel Tormé
Helen Traubel
Sophie Tucker
Rudy Vallee
Gus Van
Sarah Vaughan
Fran Warren
Dinah Washington
Paul Whiteman

Comedians

Allen & Rossi
Morey Amsterdam
Dave Barry
Milton Berle
Joey Bishop
Ben Blue and Ben Lessy
Wally Brown and Alan Carney
Red Buttons
Sid Caesar
Candy Candido
Jack Carter
Imogene Coca
Myron Cohen
Jimmy Durante
Totie Fields
Paul Gilbert
Jack Gilford
Jackie Gleason
Shecky Greene
Buddy Hackett
Peter Lind Hayes
Lou Holtz
Bob Hope
George Jessel
Will Jordan
Danny Kaye
Alan King
Jack E. Leonard
Buddy Lester
Sam Levenson
Jerry Lewis
Joe E. Lewis
Martin & Lewis
Moms Mabley
Lou Monte
Gary Morton
Zero Mostel
Jan Murray
Tommy Noonan
Olsen and Johnson
Martha Raye
The Ritz Brothers
Rowan & Martin
Jimmy Savo
Herb Shriner
Red Skelton
Larry Storch
Danny Thomas
Mae West
Bert Wheeler
Yacht Club Boys
Henny Youngman

Dancers and other celebrities

Carmen Amaya
Bill Baird's Marionettes
Edgar Bergen
Ray Bolger
John Boles
Louise Brooks
Lynne Carter
Cyd Charisse
Jack Cole
Carmen De Lavallade
The DeMarcos
Paul Draper
Katherine Dunham
Bob Fosse
Zsa Zsa Gabor
Tess Gardella
Lita Grey
Harriet Hoctor
Geoffrey Holder
Betty and Jane Kean
Peter Lawford
Gypsy Rose Lee
Jeni Le Gon
Hal Le Roy
Marie McDonald
Butterfly McQueen
Ann Miller
The Nicholas Brothers
Ann Pennington
Eleanor Powell
June Preisser
Sally Rand
Bill Robinson 
Mickey Rooney
Janice Rule
Peggy Ryan
Ethel Shutta
June Taylor
Lupe Vélez
Señor Wences
Veloz and Yolanda

In popular culture 

The movie The Bridges at Toko-Ri included a scene where William Holden is listening to an Armed Forces Radio Service broadcast of Henry Busse music from "the Chez Paree in Chicago overlooking Lake Michigan".

References

External links
The Chez Paree
Chicago Cubs through history-Chez Paree
Schatz Building History-Chez Paree

1932 establishments in Illinois
1960 disestablishments in Illinois
Entertainment companies established in 1932
Entertainment companies disestablished in 1960
Defunct nightclubs in the United States
Defunct companies based in Chicago
Former buildings and structures in Chicago
Nightclubs in Chicago